Viney Fork Baptist Church is a historic Baptist church near Speedwell in Madison County, Kentucky, at the intersection of Kentucky Route 374 and Kentucky Route 499.  It was built in 1802 and added to the National Register of Historic Places in 1989.

It is a one-and-a-half-story cut sandstone building.  Its gable end has a short, squared wooden bell tower.  It was deemed notable as "an example of a rural country church notable for its use of windows whose blunted arched shape represent a local interpretation of the Gothic style."

References

External links

Baptist churches in Kentucky
Churches completed in 1802
19th-century Baptist churches in the United States
Churches in Madison County, Kentucky
Churches on the National Register of Historic Places in Kentucky
National Register of Historic Places in Madison County, Kentucky
Sandstone buildings in the United States
1802 establishments in Kentucky